The Cantonment Church Tower is a church tower in Karnal city of Haryana, India. It is a historical religious shrine in Karnal. It stands near National Highway 1 of India. It has been declared as a historical monument by Indian National Trust for Art and Cultural Heritage. It was the tower of St. James' Church, Karnal, dedicated to St. James, one of disciples of Jesus Christ. The tower is 35 m tall, and is surmounted by an ornamental cross. The huge tower is located between the infantry parade and race course. It can be seen from a distance of 7 km.

History
With the establishment of British cantonment at Karnal, St. James' Church was constructed in AD 1806 by the British.  In 1841, when the cantonment was shifted to Ambala, the church was dismantled, but the tower was allowed to stay as it had been built out of the subscriptions of the public who objected to its dismantlement. It was built to meet the challenge of rising power of the Sikh military in the region.

Architecture 
The tower has four storeys and on the first storey, Etruscan pilaster has been used. The top storey has a semi-circular dome and the complete exterior is plastered with lime and has fine panelling work with different designs and patterns.

Administration
Cantonment Church Tower is under the supervision of Archaeological Survey of India along with All India Christian Council.

Graveyard
Graveyard of soldiers is on the left side of the Cantonment Church and on the right side is the graveyard of Indian Christians.

References

Churches in Haryana
Karnal
Anglican church buildings in India
Tourist attractions in Haryana
Church ruins in India
Former Anglican churches
Cantonments of British India
19th-century Anglican church buildings
19th-century churches in India